The 2008 AFL season was the 112th season of the Australian Football League (AFL), the highest level senior Australian rules football competition in Australia, which was known as the Victorian Football League until 1989. The season featured sixteen clubs, ran from 20 March until 27 September, and comprised a 22-game home-and-away season followed by a finals series featuring the top eight clubs. A significant feature of the season was the celebration of the 150th anniversary since the sport of Australian rules football was first established in 1858.

The premiership was won by the Hawthorn Football Club for the tenth time, after they defeated  by 26 points in the 2008 AFL Grand Final.

NAB Cup

Premiership season

Round 1

Round 2

Round 3

Round 4

Round 5

Round 6

Round 7

AFL Hall of Fame Tribute Match

Round 8

Round 9

Round 10

Round 11

Round 12

Round 13

Round 14

Round 15

Round 16

|- style="background:#ccf;"
|Home team||Home team score||Away team||Away team score||Ground||Crowd||Date||Report
|- style="background:#fff;"
|||17.12 (114) ||||14.12 (96) ||Telstra Dome||46,610  ||Friday, 18 July||AFL.com.au
|- style="background:#fff;"
|||19.17 (131) ||||10.10 (70) ||Skilled Stadium||24,801 ||Saturday, 19 July||AFL.com.au
|- style="background:#fff;"
|||16.12 (108) ||||15.14 (104) ||MCG||56,746 ||Saturday, 19 July||AFL.com.au
|- style="background:#fff;"
|||17.11 (113) ||||9.13 (67) ||The Gabba||27,784 ||Saturday, 19 July||AFL.com.au
|- style="background:#fff;"
|||18.11 (119) ||||13.11 (89) ||Telstra Dome||41,886 ||Saturday, 19 July||AFL.com.au
|- style="background:#fff;"
|||18.11 (119) ||||18.13 (121) ||Telstra Dome||38,401 ||Sunday, 20 July||AFL.com.au
|- style="background:#fff;"
||| 13.14 (92) |||| 11.14 (80) ||AAMI Stadium||31,662 ||Sunday, 20 July||AFL.com.au
|- style="background:#fff;"
||| 16.18 (114) |||| 10.8 (68) ||Subiaco||31,638 ||Sunday, 20 July||AFL.com.au

Round 17

|- style="background:#ccf;"
|Home team||Home team score||Away team||Away team score||Ground||Crowd||Date||Report
|- style="background:#fff;"
|||11.11 (77) ||||12.16 (88) ||MCG||86,179 ||Friday, 25 July||AFL.com.au
|- style="background:#fff;"
|||19.14 (128) ||||11.14 (80) ||MCG||64,785||Saturday, 26 July|| AFL.com.au
|- style="background:#fff;"
|||15.13 (103) ||||12.14 (86) ||Subiaco||34,037||Saturday, 26 July||AFL.com.au
|- style="background:#fff;"
||| 18.9 (117) |||| 16.18 (114) ||Telstra Dome||31,275 ||Saturday, 26 July||AFL.com.au
|- style="background:#fff;"
||| 6.17 (53)|||| 11.11 (77) ||SCG||26,260  ||Saturday, 26 July||AFL.com.au
|- style="background:#fff;"
||| 15.11 (101) || || 20.9 (129) ||AAMI Stadium|| 19,072 ||Sunday, 27 July|| AFL.com.au
|- style="background:#fff;"
||| 10.10 (70) |||| 14.14 (98) ||MCG||21,330 ||Sunday, 27 July|| AFL.com.au
|- style="background:#fff;"
||| 15.8 (98) |||| 18.18 (126) ||Telstra Dome|| 37,879 ||Sunday, 27 July|| AFL.com.au

Round 18

|- style="background:#ccf;"
|Home team||Home team score||Away team||Away team score||Ground||Crowd||Date||Report
|- style="background:#fff;"
||| 8.14 (62) |||| 17.14 (116) ||MCG|| 58,307 ||Friday, 1 August||AFL.com.au
|- style="background:#fff;"
|  || 19.10 (124) |||| 17.6 (108) ||MCG|| 46,334 ||Saturday, 2 August||AFL.com.au
|- style="background:#fff;"
| || 13.16 (94) |||| 12.14 (86) ||AAMI Stadium|| 40,730 ||Saturday, 2 August||AFL.com.au
|- style="background:#fff;"
|  ||20.14 (134)||||10.11 (71)||Telstra Dome|| 42,238 ||Saturday, 2 August||AFL.com.au
|- style="background:#fff;"
|  ||13.14 (92)||||11.18 (84)||Gold Coast Stadium|| 10,037 ||Saturday, 2 August||AFL.com.au
|- style="background:#fff;"
|  || 17.11 (113) |||| 14.13 (97) ||Manuka Oval|| 13,550 ||Sunday, 3 August||AFL.com.au
|- style="background:#fff;"
|  || 14.17 (101) |||| 14.9 (93) ||Telstra Dome|| 22,878 ||Sunday, 3 August||AFL.com.au
|- style="background:#fff;"
|  || 17.14 (116) |||| 12.11 (83) ||Subiaco|| 42,096 ||Sunday, 3 August|| AFL.com.au

Round 19

|- style="background:#ccf;"
|Home team||Home team score||Away team||Away team score||Ground||Crowd||Date||Report
|- style="background:#fff;"
|||5.11 (41) ||||24.13 (157) ||MCG||34,610 ||Friday, 8 August||AFL.com.au
|- style="background:#fff;"
|||18.24 (132) ||||9.12 (66) ||Telstra Dome||29,696  ||Saturday, 9 August||AFL.com.au
|- style="background:#fff;"
|||16.14 (110) ||||5.11 (41) ||Aurora Stadium||19,929  ||Saturday, 9 August||AFL.com.au
|- style="background:#fff;"
|||14.13 (97) ||||12.11 (83) ||MCG||52,135 ||Saturday, 9 August||AFL.com.au
|- style="background:#fff;"
|||17.10 (112) ||||15.18 (108) ||SCG||20,846 ||Saturday, 9 August||AFL.com.au
|- style="background:#fff;"
|||21.10 (136) ||||18.8 (116) ||Telstra Dome||31,957 ||Sunday, 10 August||AFL.com.au
|- style="background:#fff;"
|||16.12 (108)||||6.9 (45) ||AAMI Stadium||37,562 ||Sunday, 10 August||AFL.com.au
|- style="background:#fff;"
|||17.11 (113) ||||16.7 (103) ||Subiaco||35,288 ||Sunday, 10 August||AFL.com.au

Round 20

|- style="background:#ccf;"
|Home team||Home team score||Away team||Away team score||Ground||Crowd||Date||Report
|- style="background:#fff;"
|||10.15 (75) ||||16.10 (106) ||AAMI Stadium|| 23,694 ||Friday, 15 August||AFL.com.au
|- style="background:#fff;"
|||10.13 (73) ||||19.15 (129) ||Telstra Dome||32,184 ||Saturday, 16 August||AFL.com.au
|- style="background:#fff;"
|||11.13 (79) ||||5.15 (45) ||MCG||17,958 ||Saturday, 16 August||AFL.com.au
|- style="background:#fff;"
|||13.12 (90) ||||10.19 (79) ||The Gabba||27,315 ||Saturday, 16 August||AFL.com.au
|- style="background:#fff;"
|||14.10 (94) ||||20.13 (133) ||ANZ Stadium||44,955 ||Saturday, 16 August||AFL.com.au
|- style="background:#fff;"
|||16.9 (105) ||||10.16 (76) ||MCG||44,523 ||Sunday, 17 August||AFL.com.au
|- style="background:#fff;"
|||14.6 (90) ||||22.9 (141) ||Telstra Dome||43,406 ||Sunday, 17 August||AFL.com.au
|- style="background:#fff;"
||| 9.15 (69) ||||17.10 (112) ||Subiaco||34,014 ||Sunday, 17 August||AFL.com.au

Round 21

|- style="background:#ccf;"
|Home team||Home team score||Away team||Away team score||Ground||Crowd||Date||Report
|- style="background:#fff;"
|||23.13 (151) ||||15.15 (105) ||Telstra Dome||37,294 ||Friday, 22 August||AFL.com.au
|- style="background:#fff;"
|||15.15 (105) ||||15.8 (98)||MCG||24,881  ||Saturday, 23 August||AFL.com.au
|- style="background:#fff;"
|||18.21 (129) ||||7.9 (51) ||AAMI Stadium||18,875 ||Saturday, 23 August||AFL.com.au
|- style="background:#fff;"
|||16.13 (109) ||||18.7 (115) ||The Gabba||34,327 ||Saturday, 23 August||AFL.com.au
|- style="background:#fff;"
|||18.10 (118) ||||10.13 (73) ||Telstra Dome||45,507  ||Saturday, 23 August||AFL.com.au
|- style="background:#fff;"
|||17.13 (115) ||||13.4 (82) ||Skilled Stadium||24,288||Sunday, 24 August||AFL.com.au
|- style="background:#fff;"
|||13.17 (95)||||6.11 (47)||Telstra Dome||33,811||Sunday, 24 August||AFL.com.au
|- style="background:#fff;"
|||9.8 (62) ||||19.19 (133) ||Subiaco||37,040 ||Sunday, 24 August||AFL.com.au

Round 22

|- style="background:#ccf;"
|Home team||Home team score||Away team||Away team score||Ground||Crowd||Date||Report
|- style="background:#fff;"
||| 12.8 (80) |||| 8.8 (56) ||Subiaco|| 35,106 ||Friday, 29 August|| AFL.com.au
|- style="background:#fff;"
||| 10.12 (72) |||| 23.10 (148) ||MCG||22,144 ||Saturday, 30 August|| AFL.com.au
|- style="background:#fff;"
||| 24.20 (164) |||| 10.5 (65) ||Skilled Stadium|| 21,752 ||Saturday, 30 August|| AFL.com.au
|- style="background:#fff;"
||| 10.16 (76) |||| 9.13 (67) ||AAMI Stadium|| 37,545 ||Saturday, 30 August|| AFL.com.au
|- style="background:#fff;"
||| 12.9 (81) |||| 24.15 (159) ||Telstra Dome|| 49,057 ||Saturday, 30 August|| AFL.com.au
|- style="background:#fff;"
||| 17.12 (114) |||| 6.17 (53) ||SCG|| 24,076 ||Saturday, 30 August|| AFL.com.au
|- style="background:#fff;"
|||6.5 (41) ||||18.13 (121) ||MCG||37,046 ||Sunday, 31 August||AFL.com.au
|- style="background:#fff;"
|||5.9 (39) ||||21.21 (147) ||Telstra Dome||46,161 ||Sunday, 31 August||AFL.com.au

Win/loss table

Bold – Home game

Ladder

Ladder progression

Finals series

Week one

Week two

Week three

Week four

Statistics

Leading goalkickers
updated after   grand final  
The Coleman Medal was awarded to Lance Franklin for kicking the most goals at the end of the home and away season.

Disposals

Kicks

Handballs

Marks

Tackles

Hitouts

Awards
 The Norm Smith Medal as the player adjudged best afield in the AFL Grand Final was awarded to Luke Hodge, of Hawthorn.
 The Wooden Spoon was obtained by  who finished the season in last place on the ladder after 22 rounds.

Coleman Medal
Numbers highlighted in blue indicates the player led the count in that round.

Rising Star Nominees 

Club Best and Fairests

Notable events 

 This was the first season in which Carlton and Richmond faced off in what is now the traditional first clash of the season.

 This was the first season since 1998 in which NMFC competed as "North Melbourne" instead of "Kangaroos", following the end of their decade-long experiment with home-away-from-home venues in Sydney, Canberra and the Gold Coast.
 The  came back from a 37-point deficit against  at quarter time to win the game by 38 points, a 75-point turnaround, in round 3.
 The  produced its biggest ever comeback in round 4 against  when they were down by 47 points late in the third quarter to win by 20 points, a 67-point turnaround.
  forward Barry Hall was suspended for seven weeks, then the equal-longest suspension handed out since the tribunal was reconfigured to a points-based system in 2005, for striking  defender Brent Staker with a clean punch to the head. Later in the season, 's Dean Solomon beat that record, being suspended for eight weeks after hitting 's Cameron Ling in the cheekbone with an elbow.
  won its first game for the season in round 7 against  by six points, after recovering from a 50-point half-time deficit, the second-largest half-time deficit ever overcome in VFL/AFL history. This was the second in a VFL/AFL-record string of five consecutive games which Fremantle lost after holding a three-quarter time lead.
 In round 13, Dustin Fletcher (in his 288th game) and his father, Ken (264 games), claimed the record of most VFL/AFL games played by a father-son combination (552 games).
 In round 16, Richmond player Joel Bowden deliberately conceded two behinds directly from the kick-in, to waste time while protecting his team's four-point lead over Essendon. This was a major motivation for the introduction of a rule from 2009 that allows the umpire to give award free kick for a deliberate rushed behind.
 With its final-round victory,  matched 's 2000 record of 21 wins in a home-and-away season. Ironically,  also set the record for the highest average losing margin in a VFL/AFL season, with its only loss coming by 86 points against .
Franklin became the 28th player in VFL/AFL history to reach this milestone, and the first indigenous player to do so.
 In the same game, Brendan Fevola scored seven second-half goals to fall one goal short of the same milestone, becoming the first person in VFL/AFL history to finish on 99 goals for a season.
  played in a controversial draw against  at Telstra Dome in round 6; it was later revealed that Sydney had nineteen men on the field for a brief period of play before, during and after the behind that tied the scores was scored. As a direct consequence of this, the league amended the interchange laws in round 9, appointing interchange stewards to police the players and to signal to the field umpires if an infringement has occurred. Any infringement now results in a free kick being awarded.

Club leadership

Umpires
The AFL introduced an additional two boundary umpires in round 21 in order to reduce the error rate and enable the umpires to keep up with the play.

Brett Rosebury was appointed the 2008 All-Australian umpire, the first West Australian umpire to receive that honour. Controversially, however, he was not appointed to umpire the AFL Grand Final, with Scott McLaren, Michael Vozzo and Shaun Ryan selected ahead of Rosebury.

Scott McLaren umpired his 300th game, and Shane McInerney umpired his 250-game, in round 4. Experienced field umpires Martin Ellis and Matthew Head both announced their retirements during the year.

Coach changes
 Surprising some, Leigh Matthews announced his retirement as coach of the  two days after their final game of the season in what was replaced as a move to make way for potential coaching candidate, Michael Voss.

See also
 2008 Australian football code crowds

Footnotes

References 
 2008 Season – AFL Tables
 2008 AFL season – Finalsiren.com

External links 
 AFL (Australian Football League)
 2008 Interactive Fixture in Excel
 2008 Schedule By Week as a PDF
 2008 Schedule By Team as a PDF
 AFL Venue Information

Australian Football League seasons
AFL season